Earle's Chapel is an unincorporated community in Cherokee County, located in the U.S. state of Texas.  It is west-southwest of Jacksonville off U.S. Highway 79.

Government
Earle's Chapel and the surrounding area are served by Station #1 of its own Volunteer Fire Department.

Education
The Earle's Chapel area is served by the Jacksonville Independent School District.

References

External links
 Earles Chapel Cemetery at Find A Grave

Unincorporated communities in Cherokee County, Texas
Unincorporated communities in Texas